The Antoine Courtois company, founded in Paris in 1789, is a renowned manufacturer of brass musical instruments. The company's name comes from the name of the founder's children who created the brand name in 1803. The company has been a leading manufacturer of brass instruments ever since, particularly trumpet, cornet, saxhorn, flugelhorn and trombone. Today, Antoine Courtois is one of the brand names of Buffet Crampon Group, headed by Antoine Beaussant.

The renowned cornetist Herbert L. Clarke was given a Courtois cornet on joining the Queens’s Own Regimental Band in Toronto in 1883, where he served intermittently as cornetist for nine years.

References

External links

Musical instrument manufacturing companies based in Paris
Brass instrument manufacturing companies